Sub Zero is an interactive children's game show based around the show The Crystal Maze. The show featured on CBBC on BBC Two from 21 February 1999 to 11 March 2001. The show had teams of both girls (XX) and boys (XY) doing challenges and, like The Crystal Maze children's episodes, contained tasks for children of the pre-teen age group. It was pitched as the "Ultimate Battle of the Sexes".

The programme was named by a CBBC website user, 12-year-old Edward Stevenson.

Several former contestants have ended up working in the media themselves, including TV presenter Lauren Jamison and Cambridge-based radio presenter, Matt Webb.

Presenters
Jemma James
Robin Banks
Adrian Dickson (XY Team Captain from Series 3)
Rani Price (XX Team Captain from Series 3)

References

BBC children's television shows
British children's game shows
1990s British children's television series
2000s British children's television series
1990s British game shows
2000s British game shows
1999 British television series debuts
2001 British television series endings
English-language television shows